Symphytum officinale is a perennial flowering plant in the family Boraginaceae. Along with thirty four other species of Symphytum, it is known as comfrey. To differentiate it from other members of the genus Symphytum, this species is known as common comfrey or true comfrey. Other English names include Quaker comfrey, cultivated comfrey, boneset, knitbone, consound, and slippery-root. It is native to Europe, growing in damp, grassy places. It is locally frequent throughout Ireland and Britain on river banks and ditches. It occurs elsewhere, including North America, as an introduced species and sometimes a weed. The flowers are mostly visited by bumblebees. Internal or long-term topical use of comfrey is discouraged due to its strong potential to cause liver toxicity.

History
Over centuries, comfrey was cultivated in Asia, Europe, and the United Kingdom as a vegetable and herbal medicine. Its early common names, knitbone or boneset, reflect its historical use by poultices of leaves and roots to treat sprains, bruises or bone fractures. Also the roots could be mashed then packed around a broken limb, when dried they formed a hardened 'plaster cast'.

Description and botany
Comfrey is a perennial plant found in moist grasslands in western Asia, Europe, and North America. It is a perennial herb with a black, turnip-like root and large, hairy broad leaves. The leaves on the stem have margins which extends down the stems. The hairy stems are branched. Between May and June it bears small bell-shaped flowers of various colours, typically cream, white, pink or purplish. They are coiled at first and then open out.

A common hybrid is formed between Symphytum officinale and S. asperum, Symphytum × uplandicum, also known as Blue Comfrey, or Russian comfrey, which is widespread in the British Isles, and which interbreeds with S. officinale. Compared to S. officinale, S. × uplandicum is generally more bristly and has flowers which tend to be more blue or violet. Symphytum × uplandicum flowers later than S. officinale, in June and August. The plant produces significant nectar when compared to other UK plants tested. Although, it has a long tube, meaning only insects with long tongues reach the nectar, some bees have been known to bite into the side of the flower to reach the nectar.

Traditional medicine 
In folklore, Symphytum officinale roots were used in traditional medicine internally (as an herbal tea or tincture) or externally (as ointment, compresses, or alcoholic digestion) for treatment of various disorders, including commonly as a treatment for reducing the pain of osteoarthritis. John Gerard, an English herbalist (1545–1612), mentions "the slimie substance of the roote made in a possett of ale" would help back pains. The leaves were also thought to be edible as a vegetable, similar to spinach.  

A 2013 review of clinical studies assessing the possible effect of comfrey on osteoarthritis found the research quality was too low to allow conclusions about its efficacy and safety. In Europe as of 2015, there were no comfrey products for oral use, and those for topical uses to treat bruises or joint pain were evaluated as having risk of liver toxicity.

Toxicity and adverse effects
Comfrey contains pyrrolizidine alkaloids which are toxic compounds readily absorbed via the stomach or skin, and have potential to increase the risk of fatal liver toxicity. In 2001, the US Food and Drug Administration and Federal Trade Commission banned the sale of comfrey products for internal use and use on open wounds due to its potential toxicities. A 2018 review on pyrrolizidine alkaloids present in comfrey indicated widespread potential toxicity to humans and livestock, and the opportunity for drug development from these compounds.

References

External links

officinale
Demulcents
Plants described in 1753
Taxa named by Carl Linnaeus